Guardiola platyphylla, the Apache plant, is a North American species of plants in the family Asteraceae, native to Mexico and the southwestern United States. It is found in northwestern Mexico (Chihuahua, Sinaloa, and Sonora) and the southwestern United States (southern Arizona).

One plant will produce several flower heads in a flat-topped array. Each head contains 1-5 white ray flowers surrounding 3-20 white disc flowers.

References

External links
Photo of herbarium specimen at Missouri Botanical Garden, collected in Sonora in 2011
Andrew Hodgson, Andy Down Under, Trees, Shrubs & Ferns of the Sonoran Desert photos of several species including Guardiola platyphylla

platyphylla
Flora of Northwestern Mexico
Plants described in 1853
Flora of Arizona